Keratin, type II cuticular Hb5 is a protein that in humans is encoded by the KRT85 gene.

The protein encoded by this gene is a member of the keratin gene family. As a type II hair keratin, it is a basic protein which heterodimerizes with type I keratins to form hair and nails. The type II hair keratins are clustered in a region of chromosome 12q13 and are grouped into two distinct subfamilies based on structure similarity. One subfamily, consisting of KRTHB1, KRTHB3, and KRTHB6, is highly related. The other less-related subfamily includes KRTHB2, KRTHB4, and KRTHB5.

References

Further reading